Prickly sedge is a common name for several sedges and may refer to:

Carex echinata
Carex muricata, native to Europe and western Asia
Carex spicata
Carex stipata